Carlo Willem Joannes Beenakker (born 9 June 1960) is a professor at Leiden University and leader of the university's mesoscopic physics group, established in 1992.

Early life and education
Born in Leiden as the son of physicists Jan Beenakker and Elena Manaresi, Beenakker graduated from Leiden University in 1982 and obtained his doctorate two years later.

Career
After the awarding of his doctorate, he then spent one year working in the United States of America as a fellow of the Niels Stensen Foundation before returning to the Netherlands as a member of the scientific staff of the Philips Research Laboratories in Eindhoven. He was made External Professor of Theoretical Physics at Leiden in 1991.

His work in mesoscopic physics addresses fundamental physical problems that occur when a macroscopic object is miniaturized.

In 1993, he shared the Royal/Shell prize for "the discovery and explanation of quantum effects in the electrical conduction in mesoscopic systems". He was elected a member of the Royal Holland Society of Sciences and Humanities in 2001, and the Royal Netherlands Academy of Arts and Sciences in 2002. He was awarded one of the Netherlands' most prestigious science awards, the Spinozapremie, in 1999. In 2006 he was honored with the AkzoNobel Science Award "for his pioneering work in the field of nanoscience".

In a 1997 study by the Institute for Scientific Information, Beenakker rated in the top 300 most cited physicists of the previous 16 years.

In 2008, Beenakker attended the 24th Solvay Conference on Physics.

References

External links

 Mesoscopic physics in Leiden

1960 births
Living people
21st-century Dutch physicists
Science teachers
Leiden University alumni
Academic staff of Leiden University
Members of the Royal Netherlands Academy of Arts and Sciences
Spinoza Prize winners
Fellows of the American Physical Society